Patrick Gilmore (born June 1, 1976) is a Canadian actor known for playing the role of Dale Volker in the science fiction series Stargate Universe. He has also had recurring or starring roles in Battlestar Galactica, Eureka and Travelers. , Gilmore has a recurring role in the series You Me Her.

Personal life
Gilmore was born Patrick Watson Gilmore in Edmonton, Alberta, to Collette and professional hockey player Tom Gilmore, who was playing for the World Hockey Association version of the Edmonton Oilers. His brother is Scott Gilmore, executive director and one of the founders of Peace Dividend Trust, now called Building Markets. He is also the brother-in-law of Catherine McKenna, the former Canadian Minister of Infrastructure and Communities. Gilmore is a graduate of the University of Alberta with a degree in English Literature.

Stargate
Gilmore is one of the few actors to appear in all three Stargate TV series, along with Richard Dean Anderson, Amanda Tapping, Michael Shanks, David Hewlett, Ona Grauer and Gary Jones.

Gilmore's role as Volker, created for the third series (Stargate Universe), began as a simple side character. Gilmore's portrayal impressed showrunners and Gilmore was subsequently given more screen time (39 episodes), including more back story to the Volker character.

Filmography

Film

Television

References

External links
 
 
 

1976 births
Canadian male film actors
Canadian male television actors
Living people
Male actors from Edmonton
21st-century Canadian male actors